Myleene Angela Klass (born 6 April 1978) is a British musician, singer, presenter, model and businesswoman. She was a member of the pop group Hear'Say, and later released two solo classical crossover albums in 2003 and 2007. More recently, Klass has been a television and radio presenter. She has hosted television series including Popstar to Operastar (2010–2011) and BBQ Champ (2015) on ITV and The One Show (2007) on BBC One. She was briefly a regular panellist on the ITV lunchtime chat show Loose Women in 2014.

Early life and career
Klass was born in Great Yarmouth, Norfolk, to an Austrian father and a Filipino mother. She attended Notre Dame High School, Norwich, but transferred to the closer Cliff Park Ormiston Academy in the Gorleston-on-Sea area of Great Yarmouth, to complete her secondary education. While at school, she spent her Saturdays studying singing at the Junior Department of the Guildhall School of Music and Drama. She spent two years studying for her A-levels at East Coast College (Great Yarmouth Campus) and then took a musical theatre course at the Royal Academy of Music, University of London. She is also studying AstroPhysics at the Open University.

After graduating, Klass spent a short period as part of a reality show for Bravo, called The Dolls' House. She sang backing vocals for Sir Cliff Richard, with whom she had previously worked at age 10 when she sang in a choir featured in his 1988 single "Mistletoe and Wine", which was that year's Christmas number one on the UK Singles Chart, and made her West End theatre debut in Miss Saigon. Her brother, Don Klass, is an actor.

Music career
Early television work came in 1998, when Klass sang soprano for the music of the Channel 4 film Alice through the Looking Glass.

Hear'Say

In 2001, Klass auditioned for the ITV reality show Popstars, which offered contestants an opportunity to become part of a newly formed pop band. Klass was chosen as one of the ten finalists and became a member of Hear'Say, with Kym Marsh, Suzanne Shaw, Danny Foster and Noel Sullivan. Following the success of their first album, the band was given its own TV show entitled Hear'Say It's Saturday. During the show's run, the band had a chance to perform with such established artists as Lionel Richie, Celine Dion, Bradley Walsh, Blue and Atomic Kitten. At the end of 2001, Hear'Say appeared on the Royal Variety Performance.

Subsequently, the group achieved a 37-date sold-out arena tour and performed numerous television guest appearances. Klass made many appearances with Hear'Say on TV and in live performances during 2002. The pop act's many promotional appearances during the year were also broadcast as part of their own TV shows, entitled Hear'Say: A New Chapter in Full and The Hear'Say Story. In total, Hear'Say had four Top 10 singles including two number-ones in the British charts, before splitting up after a reported long-term feud between Klass and Marsh. The feud resulted in Marsh leaving the band in December 2001, to be replaced by Johnny Shentall in 2002. The band split up in October of that year.

Solo artist
On 13 May 2003, Klass signed a five-album deal with Classics and Jazz. Promotion started with the release of the main promotional single "Toccata and Fugue" to TV channels. She also appeared in the video for "Da Ya Think I'm Sexy?" with The Girls of FHM, which went to No. 10 in the UK Singles Chart.

Klass's album, Moving On, was launched on 20 October 2003 at Harrods, London. The album included reworked versions of popular classical pieces such as Fauré's Pavane, Beethoven's Moonlight Sonata and Satie's Gymnopedie No.2. Moving On also included music from the Oscar-winning films Gladiator and The Piano. New arrangements for piano of more contemporary works were also included on the album, namely Linkin Park's "Crawling" and Daniel Bedingfield's "If You're Not the One". In its first week of release. Moving On peaked at No. 2 in the UK Classical Chart, behind Hayley Westenra. It peaked at No. 32 in the UK Albums Chart. By mid-December 2003, the album had been certified gold. In April 2004, Moving On was nominated as Album of the Year in the Classical BRIT Awards. The award went to Bryn Terfel's platinum-selling record Bryn.

Klass confirmed there would be a re-release of the album with five new tracks, but its release was pushed back because of conflicts between Klass's new management company (Mel Bush Organisation) and her previous (Safe Management) regarding royalties. Ultimately, the release was cancelled, the only remnant being the Asian release of Moving On, which includes three new tracks: "Trouble" (a Coldplay cover version with Klass's vocals), "Sahara" and "Le Onde". Klass then said that she would be working on a new album which would include a number of tracks with her vocals. However, on 23 October 2004, it was announced that Klass would not be releasing any further material through her label UCJ, Universal Classics and Jazz.

On 28 March 2007, Klass signed a record contract with EMI Classics as both a recording artist and an ambassador for the EMI Classics UK roster of artists. These include Alfie Boe, Natasha Marsh and Natalie Clein. The deal included the release of a series of albums on which Klass performed two exclusive tracks and chose a number of her favourite classical pieces from the EMI Classics back catalogue. The first album, Myleene's Music for Romance, was released on 2 July 2007 and went straight to number 1 in the classical chart. A music video to accompany the lead track, "Cinema Paradiso", was shot at the Bucharest Opera House in Romania in April.

Klass's second album in the EMI series, Myleene's Music for Mothers, was released on 18 February 2008, and has two tracks played by Klass. These two tracks are the popular "America" from West Side Story, written by Leonard Bernstein, and Ennio Morricone's "Chi Mai", known best as the theme to the 1981 BBC TV drama serial The Life and Times of Lloyd George. In March 2013, she helped to celebrate Andrew Lloyd Webber's 40-year work with her rendition of "Shakalaka- Baby" from the musical Bombay Dreams.

Television career

Presenting
In August 2005, Klass was signed as a presenter for the ITV music show CD:UK with Lauren Laverne and Johny P, with her first appearance shown on 17 September 2005. In 2005, Klass appeared as a guest panellist on the topical discussion show The Wright Stuff which she did on a number of occasions. At Christmas 2005, Klass appeared on a celebrity version of the BBC's quiz show Mastermind.

On 6 August 2006, Klass was a guest reporter on BBC One's Sunday morning religion and ethics show, Heaven & Earth, with Gloria Hunniford. Klass's report, billed as the feature of the week, was on the Pope's astronomer. From 10 October 2006, Klass co-presented Living's Ghost Towns with the medium and ex-Most Haunted star Derek Acorah. In May 2007, Klass appeared on Sky HD's Test Card.

From July to August 2007, Klass co-presented the daily BBC One programme The One Show with Adrian Chiles, before leaving to concentrate on looking after her baby. On 31 December 2007, Klass presented the BBC One programme, New Year Live, for the countdown to the year 2008 at midnight.

Klass was announced as the new presenter of the Channel 4 series 10 Years Younger, on November 5, 2008, and first hosted on February 5 of the following year. The programme was broadcast every Thursday evening, from 9.00 pm to 10.00 pm. Klass replaced Nicky Hambleton-Jones as presenter. She also co-hosted the American version of I'm a Celebrity... Get Me out of Here! in 2009 on NBC.

On 31 July 2015, Klass began presenting the new ITV series BBQ Champ.

Reality television
Klass took part in the sixth series of ITV's reality television series I'm a Celebrity...Get Me Out of Here!, which began on 13 November 2006 and ended on 1 December 2006. She finished in second place, behind Matt Willis. Klass's brother Don, noticing his sister's popularity with the male audience, suggested she auction off her bikinis from the show on eBay. Within a week of leaving the jungle, Klass took his advice and put her white bikini from the show on auction on eBay until 7 December 2006. Klass pledged that all the money raised from the auction would go to charity to help victims of the Farepak savings scandal. The auction raised £7,500.

Klass's newly found sex symbol status was cemented further after Playboy offered her a six-figure deal to pose nude for the magazine. The offer was sent to Klass's agent while she was still on the show, with many offers from other magazines, chat shows and TV work. The demand for Klass increased so much that it is estimated she received offers amounting to several million pounds.

Returning to the UK, Klass did several TV and press interviews about her time on the show. Commenting on her famous showers, she said she never expected it to be such a focus of attention and that the reason for her frequent cold showers was to help cope with her sexual frustration, saying, "Forget snakes and spiders – going without sex was the hardest thing." She revealed that so great was her frustration and sexual urges after nearly three weeks without sex, that on her release from the jungle, she spent the first hours having unprotected sex with her boyfriend which resulted in her pregnancy with her first child. She also tried to end the widespread debate about whether or not her breasts are real, saying, "They're absolutely real and natural, I can assure you." About her new offers, she said she had been approached by several companies about doing bikini ranges with them.

After only one week on I'm a Celebrity..., Klass became the most searched for celebrity from the show on the Internet search engine MSN/Live Search and the third most searched for celebrity in the UK.

On 20 September 2020, it was announced that Klass would be a contestant on the thirteenth series of Dancing on Ice. She was paired with Łukasz Różycki. She became the first celebrity to be eliminated following a skate-off against Lady Leshurr and Brendyn Hatfield.

Political intervention 
In November 2014, Klass caused controversy by engaging in a heated debate with then-leader of the Labour Party, Ed Miliband, on the ITV show The Agenda. Discussing his proposals for a so-called mansion tax on larger homes, Klass expressed the view that this would hit "little grannies". In the course of discussion, she pointed to a glass of water, saying, "You can't just point at things and tax them." The row later featured in an attack on Miliband by the prime minister, David Cameron, at Prime Minister's Questions.

Radio
In February 2006, Klass began presenting the Sunday Breakfast programme on Classic FM, taking over from Aled Jones (who returned to this slot in 2016). She worked for several years on the station's early morning show on Saturdays and Sundays and since 2006 presents the Saturday and Sunday evening Smooth Classics programme (10pm1am). While working on the weekend morning show for Classic FM, she was also heard on London's Capital Radio on Sunday evenings from 8 to 10 pm. This show was also broadcast on GCap Media's One Network local commercial radio stations around the UK.

On 27 May 2008, Klass presented the BBC Radio 2 show Friday Night is Music Night in front of a live audience at the Watford Colosseum in Watford, Hertfordshire. The recording of this show was broadcast on 18 July 2008. Klass presented various shows on TalkRADIO, filling in for James Whale and Jon Gaunt.

Klass began presenting a Saturday drive-time show on Smooth Radio in 2014. Klass presented the weekday 10 am – 1 pm show covering for Kate Garraway while she was looking after her husband who had Coronavirus. Garraway returned to the mid-morning show on 14 September and Klass returned to her usual Saturday drive-time show.

Modelling
In November 2004, Klass posed for Loaded magazine. After she appeared in a shot for Maxim magazine in February 2006, it was revealed in April 2006 that Klass charted at number 78 in the FHM 100 Sexiest Women of 2006, after not being included the previous year. She had previously appeared at number 84 in 2002, number 33 in 2003 and 43 in 2004. Klass was chosen as the new face of Ortak Jewellery. In January 2007, it was announced that Klass had signed a multimillion-pound deal with Marks & Spencer to model clothes and swimwear for the new season. As the new face and body of Marks & Spencer's Spring and Summer Collection, Klass appeared in both print and television advertising, including one modelled on Ursula Andress's first appearance in Dr. No. From 2012, Klass modelled for the catalogue store Littlewoods.

Miscellaneous work
In early 2006, Klass was cast as one of the three women starring in the long-running play The Vagina Monologues and performed in Bromley, Richmond and Brighton. Her run was then extended to include all dates in Nottingham. Olympic champions joined Klass on 13 December 2006 to launch Lucky Dog, a new London 2012 National Lottery scratchcard. In 2008, Klass began designing a range of baby clothes for Mothercare called Baby K. Klass also writes a regular blog for the pregnancy and parenting website Gurgle, which is owned by Mothercare. Klass is the official godmother of the cruise ship Carnival Splendor. Klass is an EDF Energy / Team Green Britain Ambassador and took part in the launch of the EDF London Eye on 27 January 2011. In 2011, Klass began working with the children's shoe brand Start-rite, helping the company to design and promote a range of fitted footwear.

Personal life
Klass has been an amateur astronomer for most of her life, having been taught the basics by her father. She was one of a handful of celebrities, engineers and scientists who were at the UK National Space Centre control centre for the touchdown of the UK Mars probe Beagle 2 in the early morning of Christmas Day 2003. Since then, she has been a keen supporter of the UK's work in the European space programme. In March 2006, Klass publicly criticised the proposed closure of the London Planetarium and explained on television how to view Venus in the early morning. She also appeared on Channel 4's Richard & Judy to discuss the book Moondust, which follows the lives of the first men on the moon, and in 2007 attended the televised party on BBC One, held at the home of Patrick Moore in Selsey to mark the 50th anniversary of Moore's monthly programme, The Sky at Night. Klass once studied astronomy with the Open University.

In December 2005, Klass was attacked by a group of teenagers in a newsagent in Bermondsey. She had a bag of chips dropped on her head and was pushed to the ground. The teenagers attempted to take photos of Klass on their mobile phones.

In May 2006, Klass was involved in a go-karting crash at a charity race in Cardiff, South Wales, sustaining an injury to her leg.

On 1 April 2007, she announced she was expecting her first child on 7 September. As a result, she delayed her wedding to Graham Quinn until 2008. Their daughter Ava was born on 16 August 2007. Klass's spokesman said, "Myleene presented The One Show and felt a bit weird on the way home. She went to the hospital to get checked out and they told her she was in labour." Klass published a book about her experiences of being pregnant, entitled My Bump and Me: From Morning Sickness to Motherhood – An Honest Diary of My Pregnancy. She gave birth to a second daughter on 25 March 2011, called Hero.

In May 2009, Klass had an accumulated wealth of £7.5 million.

In January 2010, Klass claimed she received a warning from Hertfordshire Police for brandishing a kitchen knife (through a window) at a group of teenagers who entered her garden while she and her daughter were alone in the house. She said that she was "utterly terrified" and "aghast" at the response by the police. Hertfordshire Police denied making any such warning and stated that the law allows householders the proportionate use of force to protect themselves. It has subsequently been reported that it was Klass's agent or publicist who notified the police of the incident and who then passed on the story to The Sun.

On 21 October 2011, Klass and Quinn married, with 16 people in attendance. On 23 April 2013, she was granted a divorce from Quinn.

On 1 August 2019, she gave birth to her third child, a boy named Apollo. This was Klass's first child with her partner Simon Motson, who also has two children from a previous relationship. On 13 September 2020, Klass announced that she had become engaged to Motson.

Charity work
As part of World Vision's 24-hour famine appeal, Klass visited Sierra Leone to see how World Vision was working to help villagers build up their lives. She has also been the face of various charity campaigns such as stop text bully and ChildLine, and helped aid the Niger famine appeal by manning the telephone lines.

At the Cathedral Church of St John the Baptist, Norwich on 24 June 2005, Klass performed a selection of tracks from her Moving On album, as well as accompanying some local schoolchildren in a concert of classical standards. The cathedral summer concert was organised to raise funds for an extension of the church building. Part of this performance was recorded by MTV, which was following Klass at the time for a show called The Price of Fame. The programme was later broadcast by VH1 and also by ITV, where it was only shown in the London region. The recording by the music channel was acknowledged by Klass during the evening.

On 15 July 2006, as part of BBC One's Sport Relief charity spectacular, Klass appeared as a special guest in the Question of Sport Relief segment. Klass's appearance involved her playing a variety of TV sport theme tunes on a grand piano. This part of the fundraiser was based on the BBC's popular A Question of Sport quiz show and was hosted by Sue Barker. Guest panellists on the show included Nancy Dell'Olio and Zara Phillips, who played alongside the regular team captains Ally McCoist and Matt Dawson.

During December 2006, Klass also appeared on The Big Finish with Graham Norton, in which she competed alongside Bill Oddie and Big Brother star Nikki Grahame for the "Showbiz" team (against "Soap", "Sport", "News" and "Judges" teams) to compete to win £10,000 for the winning team's chosen charities. The Showbiz team, represented by Graham in the final round, was beaten by the Soap team represented by the former EastEnders actress Wendy Richard. In November 2007, Klass guest-presented BBC Children in Need and performed Your Song with John Barrowman. She also collaborates with Norwood, a Jewish charity for children.

Klass is an ambassador for the National Foundation for Youth Music, a children's music charity.

Filmography
Television

Guest appearances

Never Mind the Buzzcocks (2001, 2003, 2005, 2007)
 Shooting Stars (2002)
Would I Lie to You? (2007) 
Hider in the House (2007)
Al Murray's Happy Hour (2007)
The Apprentice (2008)
Celebrity Juice (2011, 2013, 2016)
Born to Shine (2011)
Countdown (2014, 2021)
Draw It! (2014)
Through the Keyhole (2014, 2017)
The TV That Made Me (2016)
The Keith & Paddy Picture Show (2017)
Michael McIntyre's The Wheel (2021)

Discography

Studio albums

Solo promotional singles
 "Toccata and Fugue" (2003)
 "Nothing To Lose" (2021), in collaboration with Veronica Green,

See also 
 List of Dancing on Ice contestants
 List of I'm a Celebrity...Get Me Out of Here! (British TV series) contestants

References

External links

 
 
 Smooth Classics on Classic FM

1978 births
Living people
Alumni of the Guildhall School of Music and Drama
Alumni of the Open University
Alumni of the Royal Academy of Music
British people of Austrian descent
British radio presenters
British women radio presenters
Classical music radio presenters
English female models
English people of Filipino descent
English radio DJs
English television presenters
English women pianists
Filipino British musicians
I'm a Celebrity...Get Me Out of Here! (British TV series) participants
Musicians from Norfolk
People from Cuffley
People from Gorleston-on-Sea
People from Winchmore Hill
Popstars winners
Smooth Network presenters
21st-century English singers
21st-century English women singers
21st-century pianists
21st-century women pianists